The Timber Mountain Log Ride is a themed log flume water dark ride at Knott's Berry Farm in Buena Park, California, United States. The ride is themed after the Knott's Calico Ghost Town. The ride is one of the oldest log flumes in the United States and is the most popular ride at Knott's Berry Farm. Moreover, the Timber Mountain Log Ride celebrated its 50th anniversary on July 11, 2019 with unique merchandise, 2 new animatronic figures and the addition of a soundtrack developed exclusively for the log ride by Krazy Kirk and the Hillbillies.

History

The original concept of the Timber Mountain Log Ride was not a log flume, but rather a roller coaster which appeared to float in a trough. However, after discussions with Arrow Development co-founders Ed Morgan and Karl Bacon, the ride's designer Bud Hurlbut chose to use a log flume ride system. The development of scenes throughout the ride saw Walter Knott approve the ride for construction. The initial $3.5 million cost for the ride was funded by the Hurlbut Amusement Company, with the ride later being sold to the park.

Timber Mountain Log Ride opened on July 11, 1969 with John Wayne on its inaugural ride. In January 2013, Knott's Berry Farm announced that the ride would undergo a five-month renovation to include animatronic figures and new scenes, while retaining the ride's theme of a 19th-century lumber camp. The ride closed on January 6, 2013, and reopened on May 31, 2013. The refurbished ride features animatronics produced by Garner Holt Productions.

During December 2012, Knott's Berry Farm decided to give the park's most popular attraction a major overhaul and upgrade. This was beginning of a major change in the park's direction with moving back into themed attractions rather than just thrills. Cedar Fair had originally planned to add another major roller coaster in Knott's Ghost Town area. However, with a change in leadership at Knott's Berry Farm and Cedar Fair, it was decided to cancel the plans for another roller coaster. Instead, the park used those funds to begin a major refurbishment and upgrade to the Timber Mountain Log Ride. In January 2013, the log ride was shut down for roughly 5 months for a major upgrade done by Garner Holt Productions. The park's in-house staff also assisted in the renovation of the ride by adding roughly 100 sequoia trees, a distinctive feature of the mountain.

On July 11, 2019, Knott's Berry Farm celebrated the 50th anniversary of the park's most popular ride: the Timber Mountain Log Ride. As part of the 50th anniversary, Knott's added 2 new animatronics designed by Garner Holt. All 36 logs were retrofitted with individual seats (similar to Splash Mountain) as opposed to the lap sitting seat design. Most of the logs feature 3 or 4 individual seats. Another major improvement made to the ride was the addition of a soundtrack. An exclusive soundtrack was developed for the ride by Krazy Kirk and the Hillbillies. The ride now features a soundtrack exclusively about the log ride, giving an much improved ride experience.

Ride
Originally known as the "Calico Log Ride" (considered groundbreaking in its time) it takes riders through a 330-foot long mountain with a theme of a 19th-century lumber camp. The ride is housed in an eight-story building that contains 24,000 gallons of water and finishes in a 42-foot free fall. The ride features 24 animal animatronic and 39 human figure animatronic figures. The ride's forest scenes (2nd and 4th) scenes feature a distinctive pine cone smell, giving riders the experience of an authentic forest setting.

Photo Gallery

References

External links

Official Timber Mountain Log Ride page

Amusement rides introduced in 1969
Log flume rides
Western (genre) amusement rides